The Apostolic Vicariate of Harar is a Roman Catholic apostolic vicariate located in the city of Harar in Ethiopia.

The Vicariate Apostolic of Harar comprises East and West Hararghe zones and Fentale and Boset woredas of East Shewa in Oromiya Region; Harari Region Provisional Administration of Dire Dawa; Somali Region with exception of Afder and Liben Zones; Amibara worda of Afar Region

History 
 May 4, 1846: Established as the Apostolic Vicariate of Galla from the Apostolic Prefecture of Abyssinia
 March 25, 1937: Renamed as Apostolic Vicariate of Harar

Bishops

Ordnaries
 Vicars Apostolic of Galla (Roman Rite) 
 Bishop Guglielmo Massaia, O.F.M.Cap. (May 12, 1846 – August 1880), resigned; future titular archbishop and Cardinal
 Bishop Louis-Taurin Cahagne (August 1880 – September 1, 1899)
 Vicar Apostolics of Harar (Roman rite)
 Bishop André-Marie-Elie Jarosseau, O.F.M. Cap. (April 6, 1900 – September 2, 1937)
 Bishop Leone Giacomo Ossola, O.F.M. Cap. (September 22, 1937 – October 19, 1943), appointed Apostolic Administrator of Novara, Italy; future titular archbishop
 Fr. Urbain-Marie Person, O.F.M. Cap. (Apostolic Administrator 1952 – July 3, 1955); see below
 Bishop Urbain-Marie Person, O.F.M. Cap. (July 3, 1955 – December 4, 1981): see above
 Fr. Georges Perron, O.F.M. Cap. (Apostolic Administrator 1982 – November 21, 1992), appointed Bishop of Djibouti
 Fr. Woldetensaé Ghebreghiorghis, O.F.M. Cap. (Apostolic Administrator 1987 – December 21, 1992); see below
 Bishop Woldetensaé Ghebreghiorghis, O.F.M. Cap. (December 21, 1992 – April 16, 2016); see above
 Bishop Angelo Pagano, O.F.M. Cap. (April 16, 2016 – Present)

Coadjutor Vicars Apostolic
Louis-Taurin Cahagne, O.F.M. Cap. (1873-1880)
Felicissimo Coccino (Cocchino), O.F.M. Cap. (1855-1873), did not succeed to see
Giusto da Urbino (Jacopo) Curtopassi, O.F.M. Cap, (1855), did not take effect
Louis-Callixte Lasserre, O.F.M. Cap. (1881-1886), did not succeed to see; appointed Prefect of Aden, Yemen

References

External links 
 GCatholic.org
 Catholic Hierarchy 

Catholic dioceses in Ethiopia
Religious organizations established in 1846
Apostolic vicariates
Roman Catholic dioceses and prelatures established in the 19th century
Harari Region
1846 establishments in Ethiopia